is a 1995 Japanese erotic film directed by Shōji Tanaka and based on a story by Kenichi Yamakawa.

Synopsis
Ryō Masuda (Toshio Kakei) is a SM movies director who asks a woman he meets on a crowded street to star in one of his films. The woman, Yumi Sakata, accepts on a whim but her expressive features—in particular, her eyes—make that particular low-budget production into an unexpected hit. Ryō is attracted to her but feels there is something dangerous or evil about her and doesn't want to have anything more to do with her. However, it isn't that simple.

Ryō's girlfriend, Mayumi, is a dominatrix who services a very powerful man. Mayumi's client, Mr. Okonogi, wants Yumi to work in an S&M show club he owns. Mayumi fears she may be "sacrificed" if Mr. Okonogi doesn't get want he wants and she begs Ryō to find Yumi and persuade her to go to the S&M club.

Ryō finally persuades Yumi to go to the club with him and Mayumi by telling her that he loves her and that Mayumi is an ex-girlfriend from a long time ago. Yumi becomes a star dominatrix (even through the film Ryō made showed her being whipped rather than whipping submissives as she does at the club).

Ryō finds himself torn between his feelings for Mayumi and Yumi's expectations. He also stands to make a considerable amount of money as Yumi's "manager" and companion.

Mr. Okonogi, who defines sadism and masochism as "two sides of the same coin," and who enjoys watching as well as participating, refuses to let Mayumi retire. It appears that he has the power of life-and-death over her. One of Mayumi's female friends, Natsumi, commits suicide rather than continue working in the S&M industry. Mayumi goes to the funeral. Ryō does not.

Cast
 Toshio Kakei as Ryō Masuda
 Yoshiko Yura as Yumi Sakata
 Kumi Shiraishi as Mayumi Yamane (dominatrix)
 Yōsuke Nakajima as Dai
 Renji Ishibashi as Ryūsaku Okunogi

Background and availability
While in Paris as a foreign exchange student in the early 1990s, Issei Sagawa was arrested for the murder and cannibalization of his girlfriend. After his return to Japan, he made an appearance in director Hisayasu Satō's pink film Promiscuous Wife: Disgraceful Torture (1992), which  made him into a cult celebrity. Spanking Love became his feature film debut.

Shōji Tanaka filmed Spanking Love for Japan Home Video and it was released in Japan by Daiei on May 6, 1995. Video Maker released it in VHS format in Japan on July 21, 1995, and it was re-released in VHS format on August 4, 2000. In their Japanese Cinema Encyclopedia: The Sex Films (1998), Thomas and Yuko Mihara Weisser gave the film a rating of two out of four stars. Media Blasters released the film in the U.S. in VHS and DVD format on their "Tokyo Shock" label on September 26, 2000.

Bibliography

English

Japanese

See also 
Sadism and masochism in fiction

External links
 Spanking Love at Media-Blasters / Tokyo Shock

Notes

1995 films
1990s pornographic films
BDSM in films
1990s Japanese-language films
Pink films
1990s Japanese films